Commercial Bay may refer to:

Commercial Bay, former bay on Auckland, New Zealand's waterfront
Commercial Bay (skyscraper), an office tower and shopping mall built there in 2020